This is a list of incidents of suicide — the intentional killing of oneself — depicted in fictional works, including films, television series, anime and manga, comics, novels, etc. Also, self-sacrifices are included as they give up their own lives.

0–9 
 1 (9), allows himself to be absorbed by the Fabrication Machine, saving 9 from said fate in the process.
 Player 069 (Squid Game), hangs himself.

A 
 Mona Aamons Monzano (Cat's Cradle), swallows ice-nine.
 Horace Abbeville (Cannery Row), shoots himself.
 Abigaille (Nabucco), poisons herself.
 Adela (La Casa de Bernarda Alba), hangs herself after her lover, Pepe el Romano, is announced killed by her mother.
 Aegeus, a character from Greek mythology, drowns himself after mistakenly believing that his son Theseus was dead.
 Piyush Aggarwal (Masaan), slits one of his wrists.
 Agnes (Poetry), jumps from a bridge.
 Aida (Aida), hides in the vault where Radamès has been imprisoned to die buried alive with him.
 Al (Divergent), jumping into the chasm.
 Karen Aldrich (Ordinary People), runs her car while in the garage.
 Alec (The Night Watch), cuts his throat.
 Misa Amane (Death Note), unknown cause. In the anime, she is last seen standing at the top of a very tall building; it is assumed that she jumps. In the manga it is suggested that she hangs herself.
 Cathy Ames (East of Eden), takes a lethal dose of morphine.
 Anck-Su-Namun (The Mummy), stabs herself.
 Andrea (The Walking Dead), shoots herself to prevent herself from turning into a walker after being bitten on the neck by an undead Milton Mamet.
 Angelica (Suor Angelica), poisons herself.
 Cesare Angelotti (Tosca) poisons himself offstage.
 Brigham Anderson (Advise and Consent), slits his throat.
 An-Mei's mother (The Joy Luck Club), eats Tangyuan laced with opium.
 Anna (The Adventure of the Golden Pince-Nez), poisons herself in guilt over Willoughby Smith's murder.
 Anne (The Chrysalids), hanging.
 Antigone (Antigone), hangs herself whilst awaiting execution.
 Antiope (Wonder Woman), jumps in the way of a bullet to save Diana Prince.
 Elena Apostol (The Night Manager), hangs herself.
 Arrack (Detective Conan), uses a poison capsule hidden in his teeth.
 Saren Arterius (Mass Effect), self-inflicted gunshot.
 Asgore (Undertale), kills himself to give Frisk his soul in any neutral playthrough after the first, if the player chooses to spare him.
 Alia Atreides (Dune), defenestration.
 Leto Atreides (Dune), poison gas capsule.
 Axel (Kingdom Hearts), channeling all his power into the Eternal Flames for a suicide attack to clear Betwixt and Between of countless Dusks, dies (as a Nobody) from overexertion.
 Rei Ayanami (Neon Genesis Evangelion), blows up her EVA to kill Armisael.
 Azala (Chrono Trigger), refuses Ayla's offer to save her and allows herself to be killed by Lavos.

B 
 Kittan Bachika (Gurren Lagann), uses his Gunman's Drill Break to destroy the Death Spiral Machine in a suicide attack, dying in the resulting explosion.
 Baek Noa (Pachinko), who changes his name to Nobuo Ban, shoots himself.
 Michael Baguenault (Seven Poor Men of Sydney), leaps from The Gap.
 Hannah Baker (Thirteen Reasons Why), swallows a handful of pills (in the TV show, she slits her wrists).
 Selyse Baratheon (Game of Thrones), hangs herself.
 Tommen Baratheon (Game of Thrones), defenestration.
 Hector Barbossa (Pirates of the Caribbean: Dead Men Tell No Tales), jumps from the anchor chain of the Black Pearl to save his daughter Carina Smyth from Armando Salazar, knowingly and willingly falling to his death in the process.
 Janet Barlow (Coronation Street), overdosed on sleeping tablets after being rejected by Ken Barlow, her ex-husband.
 Sammy Barnathan (Synecdoche, New York), jumps off of a building.
 Bloody Baron (Harry Potter), stabs himself.
 Basil (OMORI), stabs himself using handheld gardening shears.
 Lieutenant-Colonel Basil Barrow (Tunes of Glory), gunshot.
 Lily Bart (The House of Mirth), overdoses on chloral hydrate (possible suicide).
 John Barton (Looking for Alibrandi), overdoses on pills.
 Judy Barton (Vertigo), after faking a suicide as Madeleine Elster, jumps from a mission tower after being startled by a nun.
 Béatriz (The Exterminating Angel), likely ingests poisonous pills.
 Fernand de Beaumont (Life: A User's Manual), method unknown.
 Malcolm Beech (Oblivion) detonates fuel cells in an explosion to kill the Tet.
 Val Beckett (Solo: A Star Wars Story), blows herself up in a suicide attack.
 Massoud Behrani (House of Sand and Fog), suffocates himself.
Ava Bekker (Chicago Med), slits her throat open. 
 Jacqueline de Bellefort (Death on the Nile), shoots herself.
 Irene Belserion (Fairy Tail), stabs herself.
 Georg Bendemann (The Judgment), throws himself off a bridge.
 Jill Bennett (Knots Landing), asphyxia from choking on vomit while staging her kidnapping.
 Julius Berman (The Two Jakes) lights a cigarette and smokes it in a room slowly filling with natural gas, triggering an explosion.
 Creighton Bernette (Treme) throws himself off a ferry.
 Beyard (Fire Emblem: The Blazing Blade), poisons himself.
 Billy Bibbit (One Flew over the Cuckoo's Nest), slits own throat.
 John Billings (The Patriot), shoots himself.
 Bing Bong (Inside Out), jumps out of the rocket wagon.
 Warren A. "Blackie" Black (Fail Safe), stabs his finger with a poisoned needle.
 Carlton Bloom (Black Mirror), hangs himself.
 Clifford Blossom (Riverdale), hangs himself.
 May Boatwright (The Secret Life of Bees), drowns herself.
 Bobby (Paper Mario: The Origami King), blows up a rock.
 Anne Boonchuy (Amphibia), uses the power of all three Calamity Gems to defeat the Core, resulting in her body disintegrating. Not long afterwards, she is resurrected in an identical new body.
 Sarah Borden (The Prestige), hangs herself.
 Emma Bovary (Madame Bovary), ingestion of arsenic.
 Roger Bower (Awake), shoots himself.
 Norman Bowker (The Things They Carried), hangs himself.
 Mick Boyle (Youth), jumps from a balcony.
 Elizabeth Bradford (One False Move), jumping.
 Karl-Heinz Bremann (The Remains of the Day), shoots himself.
 Sergeant Brodski (Jason X), maneuvers himself and Jason Voorhees into the atmosphere of Earth Two, incinerating them both.
 Rick Brogan (Surviving: A Family in Crisis), suffocates himself inside a car with Lonnie.
 Hecky Brown (The Front), jumps out of a window.
 Richard Brown (The Hours), jumps out of a window.
 Brünnhilde (Götterdämmerung), rides on horseback into her husband Siegfried's funeral pyre.
 Bill Buchanan (24), wrestles a gun from a Sangalan insurgent and ignites an explosion in the White House presidential bunker by shooting the gun in the gas-filled room in a suicide attack.
 Lamar Burgess (Minority Report), shoots himself.
 Sammy Bushey (Under the Dome), shoots herself.
 Beatrice "Tris" Prior ("Allegiant") takes Caleb's place and survives the death serum, but is fatally shot by David.

C 
 Caelia (Tom a Lincoln), drowns herself.
 Nora Caldwell (Seconds Away), shoots herself in the head.
 Caliban (Logan), blows himself up in a truck with two grenades.
 Father Donald Frank Callahan (Wolves of the Calla), jumps out a window.
 Pete Callan (Family Affairs), suicide by police after shooting Trish Wallace.
 Calvados (Detective Conan), shoots himself in the head.
 Howard W. Campbell Jr. (Mother Night), hangs himself.
 Jericho Cane (End of Days), impales himself on a sword.
 At the beginning of Outland, Cane, under the influence of drugs, enters an elevator that goes through vacuum without his spacesuit, resulting (unrealistically) in his death from explosive decompression.
 Juliet Capulet (Romeo and Juliet), stabs herself upon discovering that Romeo Montague has poisoned himself.
 María Cardenal (Matador), shoots herself.
 Sydney Carton (A Tale of Two Cities), switches clothes with Charles Darnay so he gets guillotined in his place.
 Cassidy Casablancas (Veronica Mars), jumps off a roof of a hotel.
 Leslie Abigail Cash (Captain Fantastic), slits her wrists.
 Russell Casse (Independence Day), flies into the beam of the alien destroyer in a suicide attack, dying from the resulting explosion.
 Castel (The Bourne Identity), defenestration.
 Luke Castellan (The Last Olympian), stabs himself.
 James Castle (The Catcher in the Rye), jumps out of a window.
 Captain Denis Cathcart (Clouds of Witness), shoots himself.
 Catherine (Jules and Jim), drives a car into the water.
 John Cavil (Battlestar Galactica), shoots himself in the head.
 Katie Chandler (Stealing Home), shoots herself.
 Tom Chandler (The Bill), gunshot to the head.
 Marjorie "Maude" Chardin (Harold and Maude), overdoses on pills.
 Charlotte (The 100), jumps of a cliff after being hunted for killing someone.
 Laura Chase (The Blind Assassin), drives her car off a bridge.
 Chen Jian-hao (A Sun), jumps from a building.
 Chloe (Buffy the Vampire Slayer), hangs herself.
 Cho Sang-woo, also known as 218 (Squid Game), stabs himself in the neck.
 Ch'u Sing (Romeo Must Die), shoots himself.
 Cio-Cio-San (Madama Butterfly), seppuku; and Kim in the contemporary adaptation Miss Saigon (gunshot).
 Rosa "Miss Rosa" Cisneros (Orange Is the New Black), drives a van into a quarry.
 John Clarke (Brookside), shoots himself after shooting Kate Moses.
 Morgan Clark (Babylon 5), shoots himself.
 Claus (Mother 3), after realizing what he has done and what he has become, he attacks his brother Lucas with lightning, knowing it will kill when Lucas's Franklin Badge reflects it back at him.
 Vera Claythorne (And Then There Were None), hangs herself after going mad.
 Ramos Clemente (The Twilight Zone), shoots himself.
 Mallorie "Mal" Cobb (Inception), jumping from heights.
 Annie Collins-Nielsen (What Dreams May Come), method unclear.
 Quentin Compson (The Sound and the Fury), drowning.
 Eliza Connor (The Water Diviner), drowns herself.
 Roger Corby (Star Trek: The Original Series), disintegrates himself with a phaser.
 Corrado (Il corsaro), leaps from a cliff to his death.
 Richard Cory (Richard Cory), gunshot to the head.
 Suzie Costello (Torchwood), shoots herself.
 Doug Coughlin (Cocktail), slashes throat with a broken bottle.
 The Count (Berserk), refuses to sacrifice his daughter to save his own life.
 Doris Crane (The Man Who Wasn't There), hangs herself.
 Stella Crawford (EastEnders), jumps off a roof.
 Pietro Crespi (One Hundred Years of Solitude), slits his wrists with a razor.
 Hayley Cropper (Coronation Street), drinks a lethal cocktail.
  Marilyn Lee Cross ("The Cold Equations"), allows herself to be jettisoned from a spacecraft; it is debated whether this is a suicide due to the narrative's similarities to the tunnel problem.
 Nellie Cross (Peyton Place), hangs herself.
Connall ("Throne of Glass") drives a knife into his heart at Maeve's orders in front of Aelin Galathynius, and his twin brother, Fenrys.

D 
 Gianna D'Antonio (John Wick: Chapter 2), slits her wrists.
 Admiral Lord Horatio D'Ascoyne (Kind Hearts and Coronets), insists on going down with his ship.
 Max Da Costa (Elysium), a cyborg, tells his friend to activate a program that will kill him.
 Dagonet (King Arthur), breaks the ice-covered lake below him in a battle with an axe in a suicide attack.
 Lt. John Ezra Dahlquist ("The Long Watch"), exposes himself to a lethal amount of radiation in a suicide mission.
 Ken Daley (In Bruges), jumps from a bell tower.
 Fai Dan (Mass Effect), shoots himself so the Thorian can't make him attack Commander Shepard and crew.
 Oswald Danes (Torchwood), blows himself up.
 King Daphnes Nohansen Hyrule (The Legend of Zelda: The Wind Waker) drowns at his own insistence in a flooded Hyrule despite protests from Link and Tetra.
 Donnie Darko (Donnie Darko), realizing he was supposed to have been killed by a jet engine that fell through the roof onto his bed at the beginning of the movie, allows that to happen as the month since then reverses itself.
 Nathan Dawkins (Beyond: Two Souls), shoots himself.
 Jason "J.D." Dean (Heathers), blows himself up.
 Commodore Matt Decker (Star Trek: The Original Series), pilots a shuttlecraft down the Doomsday Machine's "throat".
 Denethor II (The Lord of the Rings), sets himself on fire (in the films, he throws himself off of Minas Tirith).
 The Deuce brothers poison themselves at the end of A Zed and Two Noughts.
 Lorna Dickey (Waterloo Road), overdoses on sleeping pills.
 Thelma Dickinson  (Thelma & Louise), agrees to ride off Grand Canyon cliff side with Louise to escape arrest.
 Dido (Aeneid) stabs herself with Aeneas' sword.
 Paul Dierden (Orphan Black) detonates a grenade after being mortally wounded.
 Jonathan "Jon" Dixon (A Million Little Things), steps over the edge of a balcony.
 Martha Dobie (The Children's Hour), hangs herself.
 Carrie Dollanganger (Petals on the Wind), ingestion of arsenic-laced doughnuts.
 Dolph (Nichijou), trips over his own feet and snaps his neck.
 Joe Donelli (Coronation Street), shot himself.
 Erik Dorf (Holocaust), swallows a cyanide pill.
 Douglas Douglas (Thinks ...) hangs himself.
 Dirk Strider (  homestuck ), Decapitates himself.
 Maya Driscoll (24), slits her wrists.
 Anastasia "Dee" Dualla (Battlestar Galactica), shoots herself.
 Daffy Duck (Show Biz Bugs), blows himself up by swallowing explosive substances and a lit match.
 Albus Dumbledore (Harry Potter and the Half-Blood Prince), killed by Severus Snape's killing curse as part of their plan.
 Tala Durith (Obi-Wan Kenobi), blows herself up with a thermal detonator in a suicide attack.
 Eduviges Dyada (Pedro Páramo), method unclear.
 Dyne (Final Fantasy VII), jumps off a cliff.
 Dally (The Outsiders (novel)) essentially does what is known as "suicide by cop" where he, held up a gun, wasn't going to shoot, and got shot, despite the protagonist, Ponyboy, thinking, 'he's just a kid'. Dally did not die a hero.

E 
 Ed ("What We Talk About When We Talk About Love"), shoots himself in the mouth.
 Martin Eden (Martin Eden), drowning.
 Eduardo (The Exterminating Angel), likely ingests poisonous pills.
 Jimmy Edwards  (One Tree Hill), shoots himself in the chest.
 Michael "Mike" Enslin (1408), dies from a fire he set in his hotel room in an attempt to destroy the haunted room in the director's cut and second alternate endings. In the theatrical, third alternate endings and short story from Blood and Smoke, he is alive.
 Eleking (Ultra Fight), shoots himself in the head after killing Alien Icarus and Kiyla. 
 Sheila Eliot (Homecomings), overdoses on sleeping pills.
 Prince Ellidyr (The Black Cauldron), throws himself into the Black Cauldron to destroy it, sacrificing his life.
 Julian English (Appointment in Samarra), carbon monoxide in garage.
 Junko Enoshima (Danganronpa: Trigger Happy Havoc), willingly executes herself due to enjoying the feeling of despair that came with her losing the final trial.
 Entei (Pokémon 3: The Movie), dies in a suicide attack on the Unown.
 Envy (Fullmetal Alchemist), tears out its Philosopher's Stone core.
 Eon-ju (A Blood Pledge), jumps from the roof of a school.
 Ewa Ericsson (Life: A User's Manual), slits her wrists.
 Sven Ericsson (Life: A User's Manual), method unknown.
 Eurydice of Thebes (Antigone), stabs herself.
 Snake Eyes (G.I. Joe: A Real American Hero (IDW Publishing)), sacrifices himself to defeat Serpentor by tackling him while armed with a grenade.

F 
 Gibreel Farishta (The Satanic Verses), kills himself after hurling Allie off a high rise.
 The unnamed farmer and his daughter whom the Hound steals silver from in Game of Thrones are revealed to have stabbed themselves in a murder-suicide when their bodies are found two seasons later.
 Tarin Faroush (24), drives his car off the top level of a parking structure to his death.
 At the beginning of the film version of Walkabout, the children's father shoots himself.
 Felix the Cat, inhales coal gas after the love of his life announces that the two have had kittens in the cartoon "Feline Follies".
 Ferro Lad (Legion of Super Heroes), real name Andrew Nolan, carries an Absorbatron bomb towards a Sun-Eater to destroy it in a suicide attack.
 Susannah Fincannon (Legends of the Fall), shoots herself.
 Theodore Finch (All the Bright Places), drowns himself.
 Adrian Finn (The Sense of an Ending), cuts his wrists.
 Flora (Fire Emblem Fates: Birthright), self-immolation.
 John Flory (Burmese Days), shoots his pet dog and then himself with his pistol.
 Flying Snow (Hero), impales herself with her own sword.
 Alex Forrest (Fatal Attraction), slashes her own wrists to frame Dan for her death.
 Adam Forsythe (Emmerdale), hangs himself off-screen while on remand.
 William "D-Fens" Foster (Falling Down), suicide by cop.
 Artemis Fowl II (Artemis Fowl: The Last Guardian), closes the second lock on the Berserker's Gate, killing himself in the process.
 Hal Francis (Blue Jasmine) hangs himself in prison.
 Frank (The Last of Us), hangs himself off-screen after being bit by an Infected.
 Frankenstein's monster (Frankenstein), incinerates himself.
 Anne Frankford (A Woman Killed with Kindness), starves herself.
 Marcy Franklin (After Hours), unspecified means (probably intentional overdose), off-camera.
 Tylendel Frelennye (Magic's Pawn), the life-bonded of Vanyel Ashkevron, jumps off a tower. Myrtle and baby both jump off golden gate bridge

G 
 Hedda Gabler (Hedda Gabler), shoots herself offstage.
 Rene Gallimard (M. Butterfly), seppuku.
 An unnamed gander (Animal Farm), eats nightshade berries.
 Gamera (Gamera the Brave), self-destructs to kill Gyaos.
 Hohannes Gardashian (America America), jumps off a ship.
 Royce Garrett (Vertical Limit), tells his son to cut the rope suspending him and falls to his death.
 Yuno Gasai (Future Diary), stabs herself.
 Captain Gates (Gray Lady Down), wedges his submersible under the submarine during a gravity slide long enough to keep the sub level and allow all the crew to be rescued, but making it impossible for him to resurface. 
 Jack Gates (Family Affairs), asphyxiates himself on his car fumes after smothering his wife, Elsa, with a pillow.
 George ("Grey's Anatomy"), walks into an oncoming bus.
 Ghazan (The Legend of Korra), deliberately causes a cave-in to preclude him from inevitably returning to prison once again, and in an unsuccessful attempt to kill both Mako and Bolin.
 Edwin Gibbs (Darkest Fear), or Nathan Mostoni, commits suicide in prison.
 Maria Gibson ("The Problem of Thor Bridge"), shoots herself. 
 Gilda (Rigoletto), allows herself to be assassinated in her lover's place.
 Gioconda (La Gioconda), stabs herself.
 Seymour Glass ("A Perfect Day for Bananafish"), shoots himself.
 Godric (True Blood/Southern Vampire Mysteries novels), "meets the sun", which as a vampire is fatal.
 Tony Gordon (Coronation Street), walks back into a burning building set ablaze by himself and is killed when the building explodes.
 Scott Gorman (Aliens), activates a grenade, killing himself and Vasquez as the aliens approach.
 Jack Grady (Fail Safe), explodes nuclear bombs inside his aircraft.
 Stewart Graff (Earthquake), chooses to die with his wife in the flooded sewer rather than climb to safety.
 Vincent Grey (The Sixth Sense), breaks into main character Malcolm Crowe's house and then shoots himself.
 Meg Griffin (Grimm Job (Family Guy)), hangs herself.
 Carl Grimes (The Walking Dead), shoots himself after being bitten by a walker while bringing Siddiq to Alexandria. In the comic series, Carl is still alive.
 Peter Grimes (Peter Grimes), scuttles his fishing boat far from land.
 Sonny Grotowski (Monster's Ball), shoots himself.
 Wanda Gruz (Ida), defenestration.
 Maurice Guest (Maurice Guest), shoots himself.
 Gullberg (The Girl Who Kicked the Hornets' Nest), shoots himself.
 Gavriel ("Throne of Glass") sacrifies himself to protect Orynth from Erawan's forces. His son, Aedion Ashryver, and Gavriel's closest friends were devastated. He was buried with other noblemen from Terrasen.

H 
 Haemon (Antigone), stabs himself.
 Clu Haid (The Final Details), gunshot in the head.
 Haines (On the Black Hill), shoots his lover Gladys Musker, before turning the gun on himself in a murder–suicide.
 Edward Hall (The Twilight Zone), possible defenestration.
 Han Mi-nyeo, also known as 212 (Squid Game), grabs onto Deok-su and forces them to fall to their deaths during the fifth game.
 Chuck Hansen (Pacific Rim) detonates a bomb inside the Striker Eureka in a suicide attack.
 Col. Nathan Hardy, (Man of Steel), crashes a Kryptonian ship into a terraforming drill.
 Violet Harmon (American Horror Story), intentional pill overdose.
 Aunt Harriet (The Chrysalids), drowning.
 Katy Harris (Coronation Street), drinking water mixed with sugar (deadly because of her diabetes)
 John Hartigan (Sin City), shoots himself.
 Kalil Hassan (24), drives his car into an oncoming cement truck.
 Brooks Hatlen (The Shawshank Redemption), hangs himself.
 Hatsumi (Norwegian Wood), hangs herself. 
 Frank Hayden (Montana 1948), slashes wrists with broken glass.
 Delilah Jane Haynes (A Perfect World), hangs herself.
 Heathcliff (Wuthering Heights), starves himself.
 Grace Heke (Once Were Warriors), hangs herself.
 Kurt Hendricks (Mission: Impossible – Ghost Protocol), jumps to his death.
 Henry (The Last of Us), shoots himself in the head.
 Nick Henshall (Emmerdale), shoots himself off-screen, gunshot audibly heard.
 Hevy (Star Wars: The Clone Wars), blows himself up in a suicide attack.
 Hideko's aunt (The Handmaiden), hangs herself.
 Hieronimo (The Spanish Tragedy), stabs himself.
 Avery Hill (Maurice Guest), drowns herself.
 Christine Hill (Dexter), shoots herself through the mouth.
 Richard Hillman (Coronation Street), attempts to kill his wife and her family by driving into a canal, but he is the only fatality.
 Hitchcock ("No Particular Night or Morning"), enters the void of space from a station.
 Zac Hobson (The Quiet Earth), overdose of sleeping pills out of guilt over the research project he was working on the night before the Effect.
 Caledon Hockley (Titanic), shoots himself through the mouth.
 Sadojima Hōji (Rurouni Kenshin), slits his own throat.
 Vice-Admiral Holdo (Star Wars: The Last Jedi), rams the Resistance MC85 Star Cruiser Raddus at the First Order Mega-class Star Dreadnought Flagship Supremacy.
 Lionel Holland (Kind Hearts and Coronets), stabs himself with a dagger to avoid bankruptcy.
 Midshipman Hollom (Master and Commander: The Far Side of the World), jumps overboard with a cannonball.
 Mary Holmes (On the Beach), suicide pill.
 Peter Holmes (On the Beach), suicide pill.
 Simon Howe (Brookside), asphyxiates himself with exhaust fumes in a car.
 Honey Mustard (Sausage Party), throws himself from the cart.
 David Hoope (Death Note), shoots himself in the head.
 Peter Houghton (Nineteen Minutes), suffocates by stuffing a sock down his throat.
 Waring Hudsucker (The Hudsucker Proxy), jumps out the window of a skyscraper.
 Ray Huizanga (Cell), shoots himself.
 Malcolm Hume (Six Years), cyanide.
 Naomi Hunter (Metal Gear Solid 4: Guns of the Patriots), turns off the nanomachines keeping her alive.
 Húrin (The Silmarillion) casts himself into the sea.
 George Hurstwood (Sister Carrie), inhales gas fumes.
 Ellen Hutter (Nosferatu), sacrifices herself to destroy Count Orlok by letting him feed on her blood until sunrise.
 Edward Hyde (Strange Case of Dr Jekyll and Mr Hyde), poisons himself.
 Hyo-shin (Memento Mori), jumps from a building.
 Henry (five nights at Freddy's), gets his own creation, one of his animatronics to kill him, because he feels he caused Afton's downfall.

I 
 IG-11 (Chapter 8: Redemption (The Mandalorian)), blows itself up in a suicide attack.
 Illusive Man, real name Jack Harper (Mass Effect 3), self-inflicted gunshot.
 Im Sang-jin (Save Me), jumps from a building.
 Imhotep (The Mummy Returns), who is holding on for dear life from being dragged down into a pit to the underworld, willingly lets go when he sees that his lover has forsaken him.
 James O. Incandeza (Infinite Jest), places his head in a microwave oven.
 Celeste Inpax (Phoenix Wright: Ace Attorney − Justice for All), hangs herself after her fiancé Juan Corrida calls off their wedding.
 The Grand Inquisitor (Star Wars Rebels), lets himself fall into an exploding generator.
 Gina Inviere (Battlestar Galactica), manually detonates a nuclear device in space.
 Isabella (The Spanish Tragedy), stabs herself.
 Iván (Julia's Eyes), slits his own throat with a knife.
 Nikolai Ivanov (Ivanov), shoots himself.

J 
 Jae-yeong (Samaritan Girl), defenestration.
 Don Jaime (Viridiana), hangs himself.
 Javert (Les Misérables), jumps off bridge and drowns.
 Henry Jekyll (Jekyll & Hyde), impales himself on John Utterson's swordstick.
 Albert Jerska (The Lives of Others), hangs himself.
 Jester (Justice League: Crisis on Two Earths), blows himself, J'edd J'arkus and Angelique up with a bomb as part of a ploy to give his universe's Lex Luthor time to escape.
 Jiang Kai (Do Not Say We Have Nothing), method unclear.
 Jihei (The Love Suicides at Amijima), hangs himself.
 Jocasta (Oedipus Rex), hangs herself.
 Young Joe (Looper), shoots himself.
 John ("Happy Endings"), shoots himself in plot C.
 Iron John (Avengers Grimm), collapses a parking garage on himself.
 John the Savage (Brave New World), hangs himself.
 Johnny (The Room), shoots himself.
 Frank Johnson (The Return of the Living Dead), incinerates himself before he turns into a zombie.
 Joker (The Dark Knight Returns), snaps his own neck.
 Mr. Jones (Dr. No), swallows a cyanide capsule. 
 Jasper Jordan (The 100) drug overdoses.
 Joseph (Contact), blows himself up.
 Dayna Jurgens (The Stand), smashes her head through a glass window and thrashes her head around so that the sharp edges of the glass cut open her jugular vein.
 Jude (Autopsy), explosion.
 A junior officer in Gray Lady Down helps Captain Blanchard close a waterproof door from the opposite side after a hull breach to the submerged submarine, trapping himself on the water-filled side and drowning.
 Juxian (Farewell My Concubine), is found dead, method unknown.

K 
 K (Kokoro), slits his throat.
 Kanjigar the Courageous (Trollhunters: Tales of Arcadia), throws himself into the daylight to keep the Trollhunter amulet out of Bular's hands.
 Ece Karan (Elimi Bırakma), shoots herself to the head.
 Anna Karenina (Anna Karenina), steps into the path of a train.
 Haman Karn (Mobile Suit Gundam ZZ), deliberately crashes her mecha.
 Father Damien Karras (The Exorcist), defenestration.
 Kasili (the Book and the Sword), stabs herself after she finds the conspiracy of Qianlong Emperor, and tells her lover Chen Jialuo "Do not trust the emperor", by writing with blood.
 Moritsugu Katsumoto (The Last Samurai), seppuku.
 Katsuro (The Human Centipede (First Sequence)), slits his throat with a shard of glass. 
 Keita (Sword Art Online), jumps off the edge of Aincrad.
 Joe Keller (All My Sons), shoots himself.
 Kelly (2:37), slits her wrists.
 Joe Kelly (Sayonara), found dead beside Katsumi Kelly, swallows poison.
 Katsumi Kelly (Sayonara), found dead beside Joe Kelly, swallows poison.
 Kenji (Rush Hour 3), separates himself from Lee, falling to his death.
 Obi-Wan Kenobi (Star Wars Episode IV: A New Hope), allows Darth Vader to kill him so that Luke Skywalker and his allies can get back on to the Millennium Falcon.
 Gabriel Kent (The Bill), jumps off the top of a building.
 Jonathan Kent (Man of Steel), tells Clark to not save him when an incoming tornado sweeps him up to his death.
 Dr. Khatri (Fortitude), fires a flare gun in the helicopter after she realizes the mercenary from the extraction team flying it has been ordered to kill her, causing an explosion that destroys the helicopter and kills them both.
 Erik Killmonger (Black Panther), real name N'Jadaka, pulls a knife out of his chest and bleeds to death knowing that he can be saved with advanced medical technology.
 Kim Jung-kyu (The Snow Queen), method unknown.
 Kim Jung-sook (Whispering Corridors), hangs herself.
 Kim So-hee (Wishing Stairs), jumps from a hospital window.
 Kim Yong-ho (Peppermint Candy), stands in front of a speeding train.
 Felicia Kimball (Nightmare Alley), shoots herself.
 Rosemary King (Emmerdale), shoots herself off-screen in America.
 Charles Kingshaw (I'm the King of the Castle), drowns himself.
 Alexei Kirilov (Demons (Dostoevsky novel)), shoots himself.
 George Kirk (Star Trek), dies aboard the USS Kelvin in a suicide attack on the Narada.
 Kizuku (Norwegian Wood), carbon monoxide poisoning. 
 Makoto Kobayashi (Colorful), overdoses on pills.
 Nagito Komaeda (Danganronpa 2: Goodbye Despair) commits suicide by causing someone to unintentionally murder him in an attempt to create an unsolvable crime.
 Irina Komarov (A Good Day to Die Hard), dies after failed suicide attack.
 Major Kong (Dr. Strangelove) rides a nuclear bomb after it has been dropped from the bomber.
 Kowalski (Vanishing Point), deliberately drives onto two bulldozers.
 Matt Kowalski (Gravity), while in space, to prevent dragging Dr. Stone with him, detaches the cable attached to the back of his MMU that Stone is holding onto, presumably suffocating in the subsequent few minutes after detaching.
 Walt Kowalski (Gran Torino), intentionally provokes gang members to shoot him.
 Taheji Koyama (Hitman), hires Agent 47 to kill him.
 Millicent Kramer (Everyman), overdoses on sleeping pills.
 Kraven the Hunter (The Amazing Spider-Man), shoots himself.
 Yoji Kuramuto (Battle Royale), in the film, hangs himself alongside his girlfriend Yoshimi Yahagi.
 Lawrence Kutner (House), dies of a self-inflicted gunshot wound.
 Kaltain Rompier ("Throne of Glass") destroys a third of Morath with her magic along with herself.

L 
 Lelouch Lamperouge (Code Geass), plans his own martyrdom by having Suzaku disguised as Zero impale him when he is parading through the streets.
 Rolo Lamperouge (Code Geass), uses repeatedly his Geass in a suicide rescue to save Lelouch, dying from overexertion. 
 John Lancaster (London Has Fallen), forces Jax to shoot him instead of surrendering.
 Nathan Landau (Sophie's Choice), ingests sodium cyanide.
 Alfred Lanning (I, Robot), orders Sonny to throw him from the top floors of the US Robotics headquarters building.
 Claude Lantier (L'Œuvre), hangs himself.
 Latios (Pokémon Heroes) uses all his psychic ability to save Altomare from an oncoming tsunami, dying corporeally from overexertion.
 Harold Lauder (The Stand), shoots himself in the head.
 Laura (The Orphanage), takes an overdose of sleeping pills.
 Leonard "Gomer Pyle" Lawrence (Full Metal Jacket), self-inflicted gunshot wound after murdering his drill instructor.
 Georges Leblanc (Elle), hangs himself.
 Lee Cheon-ji (Thread of Lies), hangs herself.
 Lee Jin-pyo (City Hunter), suicide by secret service.
 Lee Soo-ah (Oldboy), separates herself from her brother Woo-jin trying to pull her up, falling from a dam to her death.
 Lee Soo-hyeok (Joint Security Area), shoots himself in the mouth.
 Lee Woo-jin (Oldboy), shoots himself in the head.
 Johan Leebig (The Naked Sun), poisons himself out of fear of human contact.
 General Leia Organa (Star Wars: The Rise of Skywalker), uses her remaining strength to reach out to her son Kylo Ren through the Force.
 Leonora (Il Trovatore), poisons herself.
 Ernst Lessner (Land of Mine), walks through a minefield until he detonates a landmine.
 Myra Lester (Waterloo Bridge), walks into path of a moving truck.
 Sarah Lewis (Home and Away), shoots herself.
 Hu Li (Rush Hour 2), blows herself up.
 Liam (My Name Is Joe), hangs himself rather than face retribution from a drugs gang.
 Zuzanna "Zula" Lichoń (Cold War), overdoses on pills.
 Su Lin (Enter the Dragon), stabs herself with a shard of glass.
 Bonnie Lisbon (The Virgin Suicides), hangs herself.
 Cecilia Lisbon (The Virgin Suicides), jumps out of her bedroom window.
 Lux Lisbon (The Virgin Suicides), poisons herself with carbon monoxide.
 Mary Lisbon (The Virgin Suicides), overdoses on sleeping pills.
 Therese Lisbon (The Virgin Suicides), overdoses on sleeping pills.
 Tom Lister (Brute Force), hangs himself.
 Little Father Time (Jude the Obscure), hangs himself.
 Liù (Turandot), stabs herself.
 Gordon Livesy (Emmerdale), hangs himself one day into an 18-year prison sentence for sexually abusing his son.
 Livia (Constance), hangs herself.
 Joy Lobo (3 Idiots), hangs himself.
 Willy Loman (Death of a Salesman), car crash.
 Kevin Lomax (The Devil's Advocate), shoots himself to prevent being forced to create an heir, but is still alive after John Milton loops him back to the courthouse bathroom.
 Mary Ann Lomax (The Devil's Advocate), cuts her throat with the shards of a broken mirror.
 Lonnie (Surviving: A Family in Crisis), suffocates herself inside a car with Rick Brogan.
 Ilse Lubin (Midnight's Children), drowns herself.
Lucario (Lucario and the Mystery of Mew), takes Ash's aura and uses all of his own to save Mew and the Tree of Beginning and dies of overexertion.
 Don Luis (Belle Époque), hangs himself.

M
 M ("Men Without Women"), unspecified.
 M-5 (Star Trek: The Original Series), shuts itself down, believing it deserves to die.
 Maab (Star Trek: The Original Series), deliberately lets the Klingon Kras disintegrate him with a phaser.
 Lady Macbeth (Macbeth), off-stage, method unspecified, "Who, as 'tis thought, by self and violent hands took off her life".
 Lori Madison (The Deuce), shoots herself in the head in a hotel room.
 Madotsuki (Yume Nikki), throws herself off her apartment balcony.
 Maedhros (The Silmarillion), casts himself into a fiery chasm.
 Norman Maine (A Star Is Born), drowns himself by getting inebriated and walking into the ocean.
 Majid (Caché), slits his throat.
 Prince Mamuwalde (Blacula), intentionally exposes himself to sunlight.
 Oscar "Manny" Manheim (Runaway Train), releases the railway coupling of a runaway train connecting the engine and the freight and soon crashes to his death.
 Elliott Mantle (Dead Ringers), disemboweled by his brother Beverly at his own request. The end of the film suggests Beverly then purposely overdoses.
 Sal Marcano (Mafia III), self-inflicted gunshot.
 Traveler 3569, also known as Marcy Wharton (Travelers), self-inflicted gunshot to prevent Traveler 001 from acquiring code for communicating with the director in Marcy's brain. A timeline reset later in the episode caused the chain of events leading to her suicide to never occur, and she is seen alive at the end.
 Lt. Col. Matthew Andrew Markinson (A Few Good Men), shoots himself.
 Kate Marsh (Life Is Strange), if the player chooses not to save her she will jump off the school roof.
 Benigno Martín (Talk to Her), overdoses on sleeping pills.
 Habib Marwan (24), while hanging from the upper floors of a parking structure, separates himself from a Jack Bauer who is trying to pull him up to safety, falling to his death.
 Mary ("Happy Endings"), overdoses on sleeping pills and aspirins in plot B.
 Bertha Mason (Jane Eyre), sets fire to Thornfield Hall and dies by jumping off the roof of the burning building. 
 George Mason (24), who has no more than a few hours to live due to exposure to plutonium radiation, convinces Jack Bauer to let him finish flying a plane carrying a live nuclear warhead into the Mojave Desert, dying from the blast.
 Master Shake (Aqua Teen Hunger Force), jumps into a pool full of piranhas while overdosed on sleeping pills and breathing in carbon monoxide. 
 Matsumoto ("The Silence"), jumps in front of a train.
 Yuko Matsunaka ("A Shinagawa Monkey"), slits her wrists.
 M.C. (Cabaret), in the 1998 revival, is taken to a concentration camp, where he throws himself onto the electric fence.
 Kenny McCormick (South Park), sacrifices himself via electrocution while turning on a hospital generator in an attempt to revitalize Dr Mephesto.
 Col. McCullough (War for the Planet of the Apes), or simply The Colonel, shoots himself.
 Chuck McGill (Better Call Saul), burns his own house while inside it.
 McWatt (Catch-22), flies his plane into a mountain.
 Meatwad (Aqua Teen Hunger Force), shoots himself in the head. 
 Medora (Il corsaro), poisons herself.
 Raul Menendez (Call of Duty: Black Ops II), self-immolation.
 Michael Mensana (First Reformed), shoots himself.
 Metal Sonic (Sonic the Hedgehog (OVA)), refuses help from the real Sonic and chooses to be killed by rising magma.
 I. J. "Multiple" Miggs (The Silence of the Lambs), gets talked into killing himself by Hannibal Lecter.
 Mighty (Bomberman Jetters), critically wounded, goes on a mission to destroy a Hige-Hige base, dying in the explosion.
 Julia Milliken (24), shoots herself.
 Teru Mikami (Death Note), stabs himself with a pen.
 Naomi Misora (Death Note), hangs herself.
 Jacob Mitchell (A Simple Plan), tells his brother to shoot and kill him, threatening to shoot himself if the brother does not comply.
 Peggy Mitchell (EastEnders), intentionally overdoses on medication.
 Stanley "Stan" Mitchell (Stan), drowns himself and his pregnant girlfriend in a murder–suicide by driving off a bridge and into a river.
 Mitsuhirato (The Blue Lotus), commits seppuku.
 Miura (The Bad Sleep Well), runs in front of a moving truck.
 Kyuzo Miyabe (The Eternal Zero), kamikaze.
 Kojiro Miyawaki (The Wind-Up Bird Chronicle), hangs himself.
 Natsuko Miyawaki (The Wind-Up Bird Chronicle), hangs herself.
 Monitor Kernel Access / Monika.chr / Monika (Doki Doki Literature Club!), deletes self from game.
 Romeo Montague (Romeo and Juliet), takes poison after finding Juliet whom he believed to be dead.
 "Papa" Monzano (Cat's Cradle), swallows ice-nine.
 Michael Moore (Team America: World Police), blows himself up in a suicide bombing.
 Morao (Celda 211), slits his wrists.
 Tom Morgan (Eagle Eye), rams his car into a large piece of metal in a suicide attack.
 James "Jim" Moriarty (Sherlock), shoots himself.
 Jerome Morrow (Gattaca), sets himself on fire in the incinerator in his house.
 Mothra (Godzilla: Final Wars), kamikazes into Gigan; killing both of them in the process. 
 Darren Mullet (Tormented), hangs himself.
 Aniki Murakawa (Sonatine), shoots himself in the head.
 Connor Murphy (Dear Evan Hansen), unspecified, but a song that was deleted from the final show alludes to an overdose on pills.

N 
 Nana (A Thousand Splendid Suns), hangs herself.
 Nanny (The Omen), hangs herself.
 Naoko (Norwegian Wood), method unclear.
 Nathaniel/John Mandrake (Ptolemy's Gate), collapses a building on himself to destroy Nouda the Terrible.
 Neil Perry (Dead Poets Society), shoots himself.
 Neo (The Matrix Revolutions), allows Agent Smith to assimilate him so the machines can destroy them both.
 Robert Neville (I Am Legend), takes cyanide pills to avoid brutal execution from his zombified captors. In film, he sacrificed himself by detonating himself alongside infected humans to save two uninfected humans. In comics, he was killed by mutated-but-retained humans.
 Newt (The Death Cure), begs Thomas to kill him so that he does not have to succumb to the Flare virus.
 Nicholas (The Walking Dead), shoots himself to prevent himself getting devoured by a large group of walkers.
 Ralph Nickleby (Nicholas Nickleby), hangs himself.
 Niënor Níniel (The Silmarillion), casts herself into a river.
 Nineteen-hundred (The Legend of 1900), or 1900, knowingly stays on a ship rigged to explode.
 Nomad (The Changeling (Star Trek: The Original Series)), blows itself up after being convinced that it is not perfect after all.
 Norma (Norma), immolates herself.
 Samuel Norton (The Shawshank Redemption), shoots himself.
 Hasan Numair (24), detonates an atomic bomb in a suicide terror attack.
 El número (Belle Epoque), shoots himself.
 Nux (Mad Max: Fury Road), crashes his vehicle to collapse a canyon and its vehicles in a suicide attack.

O 
 Doctor Octopus (Spider-Man 2), sacrifices himself to save New York City.
 Sakura Ogami (Danganronpa: Trigger Happy Havoc), poisons herself.
 Sakura Ogawa (Battle Royale), throws herself off a cliff alongside Kazuhiko Yamamoto.
 Okonkwo (Things Fall Apart), hangs himself.
 The unnamed old man in A Quiet Place screams to draw the attention of the creatures that killed his wife.
 Helen O'Loy ("Helen O'Loy"), a metallic robot, with the assistance of a human, dissolves herself in acid.
 Olya (The Adolescent), hanging.
 Kokichi Oma (Danganronpa V3: Killing Harmony), asks another character to crush him in a hydraulic press.
 Simon O'Neill, (Battlestar Galactica: The Plan), rigs an airlock outside of resurrection range, dying in space.
 Angela Orosco (Silent Hill 2), unknown cause, though the last she was seen she was walking up a burning staircase.
 Jacopo Ortis (The Last Letters of Jacopo Ortis), stabs himself.
 Ophelia (Hamlet), drowning (ambiguous).
 John Osborne (On the Beach), suicide pill. Julian Osborne, the same character in the 1959 film, commits suicide via carbon monoxide poisoning.
 Othello (Othello), stabs himself.
 Owlman (Justice League: Crisis on Two Earths), allows himself to be blown up by his own planet-destroying bomb.

P 
 Walter Paisley (A Bucket of Blood), hangs himself after committing multiple murders.
 Heinrich and Berta Palitz (Holocaust), poison themselves shortly after Kristallnacht.
 Henry L. Palmetto (The Great Gatsby), jumps in front of a subway train.
 Pandora (God of War III), sacrifices herself to put out the Flame of Olympus, allowing Kratos to open her box.
 Parone (Saga), hangs himself.
 Emir Parkreiner (Killer7), shoots himself after murdering the Killer7.
 Gabriel Pasternak (Wild Tales), rams an airplane into his parents' house.
 The title character in "Paul's Case" jumps in front of a train.
 Christine Penmark (The Bad Seed), shoots herself in the head.
 Frank Pentangeli (The Godfather Part II), slits his wrists.
 Stacker Pentecost (Pacific Rim) detonates a bomb inside the Striker Eureka in a suicide attack.
 Neil Perry (Dead Poets Society), shoots himself.
 Petunia (Happy Tree Friends), skins herself with a potato peeler.
 Phoenix I, in the form of Jean Grey (Uncanny X-Men), telekinetically activates an energy cannon that disintegrates her.
 Piccolo (Dragon Ball), takes one of Nappa's attacks to protect Gohan.
 Yvette Gessard-Picard (Star Trek: Picard), hanged herself in the solarium. Her son Jean-Luc discovered her body, and blamed himself for her death for decades afterward.
 Eugene Pontecorvo (The Sopranos), hangs himself after being denied the chance to move to Florida by both Tony Soprano and the FBI. 
 Edna Pontellier (The Awakening), drowns herself in the Gulf of Mexico.
 Frederick Pope (The Red Violin), poisoning or drowning.
 Portia (Julius Caesar), "swallows fire".
 Predator (Predator), blows itself up in an attempt to finish Major Alan "Dutch" Schaefer.
 Titus Price (Anna of the Five Towns) hangs himself.
 Margaret Prior (Affinity), drowns.
 Scott Pritchard (No Way Out) shoots himself.
 The Protagonist (Persona 3) expends all of their life energy to seal away Nyx and prevent her from destroying humanity.
 Adrian Doyle Pryce (Oldboy), shoots himself.
 Arthur Pryce (Oldboy), unspecified.
 Lane Pryce (Mad Men), hangs himself.
 Madelyne Pryor (X-Men), mentally commits suicide by forcing her mind to shut down.
 Two Pyramid Heads (Silent Hill 2), both stab themselves in the head with giant spears.
 Pyramus (Pyramus and Thisbe) falls on his sword.

Q 
 Rose Quartz (Steven Universe), chooses to get pregnant with and give birth to Steven, knowing doing so will kill her.
 Quasimodo (The Hunchback of Notre-Dame), starves himself to death in the Gibbet of Montfaucon while clutching Esmeralda's corpse.
 Quicksilver (Avengers: Age of Ultron), shields Hawkeye and a child from gunfire using his own body.

R 
 Admiral Shala'Raan vas Tonbay (Mass Effect 3), self-inflicted gunshot.
 Niall Rafferty (Hollyoaks), throws himself off a cliff.
 Daisy Randone (Girl, Interrupted), method is unknown in the novel while in the movie, she hangs herself and cuts her wrists.
 Ill Ratt (Death Note), real name Carl Darlingbin, shoots himself in the head.
 Edgardo Ravenswood (Lucia di Lammermoor), stabs himself. 
 Susan Rawling (To Room Nineteen), gasses herself.
 Red (Red Hot Riding Hood), nicknamed Wolf, shoots himself with two guns.
 Simone Renoir (The Librarian: Curse of the Judas Chalice), a vampire, chooses to see one last sunrise.
 Denholm Reynholm (The IT Crowd), jumps out of a window.
 Maximilien Riccetti (Life: A User's Manual), hangs himself.
 Richard (Go Tell It on the Mountain), slits his wrists.
 John Richter (Guttersnipe), suicide by cop.
 Ethan Rickover (Monk) shoots himself in the head after it is revealed that he killed three people including Adrian Monk's wife.
 Ty Riggs (The Last Time We Say Goodbye), shoots himself.
 Ellen Ripley (Alien 3), throws herself into a blast furnace and a Queen Chestburster emerges from her chest.
 Brig.-Gen. Jack D. Ripper (Dr. Strangelove), shoots himself.
 Risa's father (Pachinko), method unknown.
 First RoboCop 2 Prototype (RoboCop 2), shoots himself in the head.
 Second RoboCop 2 Prototype (RoboCop 2), pulls off its helmet, severing its own life support.
 Rodolfo (Luisa Miller), poisons himself after poisoning Luisa.
 Natasha Romanoff (Avengers: Endgame), also known as Black Widow, sacrifices herself for the Soul Stone.
 Fedora Romazoff (Fedora), poisons herself.
 Romulan commander (Star Trek: The Original Series), intentionally blows up his own ship.
 Rosemary (The Giver), poisons herself.
 Carolyn Baker Rossi (Criminal Minds), fatal overdose of pills.
 Sol Roth (Soylent Green), ingests poison.
 Administer Rubio (Arknights), shoots himself.
 Brock Rumlow (Captain America: Civil War), vest explosion.
 Andrew Ryan (BioShock), orders Jack to kill him.
 Bernard Ryder or Mr. Blue (The Taking of Pelham One Two Three), electrocutes himself. Suicide by cop in the 1998 film. He tempts New York City subway dispatcher Walter Garber to shoot him in the 2009 film.
 Ryoma (Fire Emblem Fates: Conquest), seppuku.
 Ryu's Sister (Sympathy for Mr. Vengeance), slits her wrists while in her bathtub.

S 
 Sabriya (Damascus – the Smile of Sadness), hangs herself from a lemon tree.
 Michiru Saiki (ReLIFE), hangs herself.
 Jeremiah de Saint-Amour (Love in the Time of Cholera), method unspecified.
 Yuko Sakaki (Battle Royale), jumps from a lighthouse.
 Hector Salamanca (Breaking Bad), bombs himself in a successful attempt to kill Gus Fring.
 Stefan Salvatore (The Vampire Diaries), burns in hell fire.
 Sang-hyun (Thirst), a vampire, exposes himself to the sun.
 Esther Sanson (Green for Danger), swallows a lethal dose of pills.
 Gen. Alexei Sarov (Skeleton Key), shoots himself.
 Campbell Saunders (Degrassi), methods unknown.
 Louise Sawyer (Thelma & Louise), drives off a Grand Canyon cliff.
 Sayoko ("With the Beatles"), hangs herself.
 Sayori (Doki Doki Literature Club!), hangs herself in her room.
 Hanna Schmitz (The Reader), method unknown.
 Peter Schuler (Breaking Bad), electrocutes himself.
 Schwarz (Sebastian) injects himself with a poison.
 Rufus Scott (Another Country), jumps from the George Washington Bridge.
 Diane Selwyn (Mulholland Drive), shotgun to head.
 Sensei (Kokoro), method unclear.
 Senta (The Flying Dutchman), throws herself into the sea.
 Princess Serenity (Sailor Moon), stabs herself.
 Daisuke Serizawa (Godzilla), dies of asphyxiation after cutting off his air support in the ocean. 
 Shadow (Final Fantasy VI), leaves party to remain on Kefka's Tower during its collapse.
 Maj. Kendra Shaw (Battlestar Galactica: Razor), manually detonates a nuclear device in a suicide attack.
 Raymond Shaw (The Manchurian Candidate), shoots himself in the 1962 film, while it is left unclear how he dies in the novel.
 Dr. Sheppard (The Murder of Roger Ackroyd), poison.
 Taeko Shimabara (Noriko's Dinner Table), method unknown.
 Mr. Shimerda (My Ántonia), unspecified.
 Shin (Fist of the North Star), jumps from the peak of his tower.
 Taariq Shirazi (The Bridge) shoots himself in the mouth.
 Shouan (Sword of the Stranger), hangs himself.
 Shun (Children Who Chase Lost Voices), jumps from a ledge.
 Shura (Day of the Daleks), suicide bombing.
 Christa-Maria Sieland (The Lives of Others), runs in front of a moving truck.
 Ira Silverstein (The Woods), gunshot in the mouth.
 David Sinclair (Permanent Record), jumps off a cliff.
 Sindel (Mortal Kombat), method unclear.
 John Singer (The Heart Is a Lonely Hunter), shoots himself.
 Hareli-Frodlin-Sirinial (Animorphs #18, The Decision), initiates the self-destruct sequence of the Ascalin, killing himself and every other Andalite aboard.
 Sitka (Brother Bear), sacrifices himself to save his younger brothers Denahi and Kenai from a bear.
 Ethel Skinner (EastEnders), assisted suicide by drug overdose.
 Luke Skywalker (Star Wars: The Last Jedi), expends all of his energy to create a Force projection to confront his nephew Kylo Ren and dies shortly afterwards from overexertion.
 Mimi Slocumb (Igby Goes Down), colludes with her son Ollie to feed her poisonous yogurt. 
 Smerdyakov (The Brothers Karamazov), hanging.
 Septimus Warren Smith (Mrs Dalloway), jumps out of a window.
 Dr. Ward Smith (Stranger in a Strange Land), slits his throat with a scalpel.
 Snow White (Avengers Grimm), stabs herself with an icicle.
 Ben Solo (Star Wars: The Rise of Skywalker), sacrifices himself by resurrecting Rey through the Force, draining his own life force in the process.
 Sorais (Allan Quatermain), stabs herself.
 Alex Stafford (Redeeming Love), gunshot after realizing the prostitute he had sex with was his daughter.
 Ace Stamper (Splendor in the Grass), jumps out of a window.
 Harry Stamper (Armageddon), takes A.J.'s place in detonating the bomb to obliterate the asteroid headed for Earth, dying in the blast.
 Tony Stark (Avengers: Endgame), uses the Infinity Stones to kill Thanos and his army, and is subsequently killed by their power.
 Nikolai Vsevolovich Stavrogin (Demons), hanging.
 Molly Stearns (The Ides of March), possibly overdoses on pills.
 Grace Stewart (The Others), shoots herself.
 Moritz Stiefel (Spring Awakening), shoots himself.
 "Junior" Stillo (The Last House on the Left), shoots himself in the head with a handgun.
 Straits/Straizo (Battle Tendency), channels Hamon into his body.
 Trevor Strathmore (Digital Fortress), explosion.
 Gordon Stretton (May Day) shoots himself.
 Sue-Shaun (Battlestar Galactica), tells Starbuck to destroy her life support machine rather than try to save her.
 Suldrun (Lyonesse), hangs herself.
 Holly Summers (No More Heroes), places a grenade in her mouth.
 James Sunderland (Silent Hill 2), drowns himself by driving off a cliff and into a lake in the In Water ending.
 Sunny (Omori), can stab himself with a knife or jump off of a rooftop depending on the ending.
 Svidrigailov (Crime and Punishment), gunshot to the head.
 Cynthia Swann (The First Wives Club), throws herself off her apartment balcony.
 Sylvester (Scaredy Cat), shoots himself with a gun.

T
 T-800 Terminator (Model 101) (Terminator 2: Judgment Day), lowered into a pit of molten steel by John Connor on his own orders, since he cannot self-terminate.
 T-850 Terminator (Terminator 3: Rise of the Machines), self-destructs by detonating his nuclear cell to destroy the T-X.
 Suzze T (Live Wire), heroin overdose.
 Kiyomi Takada (Death Note), self-immolation.
 Takumi (Fire Emblem Fates: Conquest), jumps off a rampart.
 Tanida (Letters from Iwo Jima), blows himself up with a grenade. 
 Claude Tanner (Degrassi High), shoots himself in the head.
 Gen. Wilhelm Tanz (The Night of the Generals), shoots himself.
 Tarantula I (The Amazing Spider-Man), jumps to his death.
 Tarrlok (The Legend of Korra), commits a fratricidal murder-suicide as a means of atoning for the innumerably abysmal transgressions he and his brother Noatak/Amon committed during their respective earthly sojourns.
 Tasha (Gargoyles: Bad Guys), hangs herself.
 Yousuke Tateishi (Death Parade), defenestration.
 Bob Taylor (Prisoners), gunshot in the mouth.
 Jax Teller (Sons of Anarchy), crashed into semi-truck.
 John Teller (Sons of Anarchy), crashed into semi-truck.
 Clark Terrell (Star Trek II: The Wrath of Khan) disintegrates himself with his own phaser when he cannot otherwise resist the creature controlling him after Khan orders him to kill a fellow Starfleet officer.
 Thanos (Thanos: The Infinity Relativity), decapitates himself.
 Rob Thatcher (The Bill), suicide by police after shooting Irene Radford, his father's killer.
 Eddie Thawne (The Flash), shoots himself. 
 Thee (Ladda Land), shoots himself.
 Éponine Thenardier (Les Misérables), takes a musket ball for Marius Pontmercy.
 Thisbe (Pyramus and Thisbe), stabs herself with Pyramus' sword.
 Tim "Ben" Thomas (Seven Pounds), releases a box jellyfish inside a tub of water with him inside, succumbing to the stinging wounds.
 Harlan Thrombey (Knives Out), slits his own throat.
 Tien Shinhan (Dragon Ball), uses up all of his energy in a suicide attack on Nappa.
 Mike Timlin (Inside Llewyn Davis), jumps off the George Washington Bridge.
 Silene “Tokyo“ Oliveira (Money Heist), suicide bombing
 Rogelio Torrez (Machete), commits seppuku.
 Floria Tosca (Tosca), jumps from Castle Sant'Angelo.
 Col. Towers ("The Long Watch"), shoots himself.
 Alfredo Traps (A Dangerous Game), hangs himself.
 Evan Treborn (The Butterfly Effect), reverses time until pre-existence. (This scene only happens in the directors' cut)
 Konstantin Gavrilovich Treplyov (The Seagull), shoots himself.
 Steve Trevor (Wonder Woman), shoots flammables in a back of an airplane, dying in the subsequent explosion.
 Troglyte "disruptor" (Star Trek: The Original Series), leaps to his death from high altitude.
 Green Pickup Truck (The Brave Little Toaster), deliberately drives onto a car crusher's conveyor belt.
 Bac Hoai Truong (Birds of Paradise Lost), self-immolation.
 Túrin Turambar (The Silmarillion) casts himself onto his sword.
 Col. Turner (Where Eagles Dare), jumps out of a moving airplane.
 Diane Turner (Criminal Minds), kills both herself and Maeve Donovan with a single gunshot.
 Jojo Turrie (Homefront), suicide by cop.
 Sam Tyler (the British version of Life on Mars), jumps off the roof of Manchester police headquarters.
 The Thirteen ("Throne of Glass") sacrifice themselves to the yielding in order to destroy Erawan's witch towers to help defend Orynth. Manon Blackbeak-Crochan is devastated with the deaths of the Thirteen.

U 
 Yondu Udonta (Guardians Of The Galaxy Vol. 2), takes off his spacesuit in outer space and gives it to Peter Quill, causing him to suffocate.
 Ugolin (Manon of the Spring), hangs himself.
 Kosetsu Urabe (Code Geass), causes an explosion by stabbing a nearby enemy Knightmare with his own Knightmare sword.
 Stanley Uris (It), slits his wrists, writing "IT" on the wall with his own blood.

V 
 Jerome Valeska (Gotham), chooses to fall to his death from a metal pole when Jim Gordon refuses to rescue him.
 Sibyl Vane (The Picture of Dorian Gray), drinks poison.
 Nacho Varga (Better Call Saul), shoots himself in the head.
 Various (Mortal Kombat: Deception), method varies from character to character.
 Jenette Vasquez (Aliens), activates a grenade, killing herself.
 Vegeta (Dragon Ball Z), destroys himself with a suicide attack in an attempt to kill Majin Buu.
 Shane Vendrell (The Shield), self-inflicted gunshot to the head.
 Carlo Ventresca (Angels & Demons), known as Patrick McKenna in the film adaptation, self-immolation.
 Winnie Verloc (The Secret Agent), drowns herself in the English Channel.
Jordy Verrill (Creepshow and Weeds, shoots himself in the head with his shotgun after being overcome by alien vegetation.
 Eustacia Vye (The Return of the Native), drowning (possible suicide).

W 
 Toby Jay Wadenah (The Pledge), shoots himself in the head.
 Dave Walker (Attack of the Giant Leeches), hangs himself in jail. 
 Molly Walker  (Heroes), shoots herself.
 Wally (La Wally), leaps off a precipice.
 "Walter" (Get Out), shoots himself in the head.
 Dr. Wanless (Firestarter) puts on his wife's underwear and puts his arm down the garbage disposal, eventually bleeding to death (in the film adaptation, this is not shown, merely described).
 Justice Lawrence Wargrave (And Then There Were None), self-inflicted gunshot wound to the head.
 President Earl Warren (Colonization: Aftershocks), kills himself after deciding to allow Indianapolis to be bombed.
 Wiktor Warski (Cold War), overdoses on pills.
 Yukio Washimine (Black Lagoon), pierces her own throat with Ginji's sword.
 Harry Waters (In Bruges), shoots himself in the head.
 Sarah Waybourne (Picnic at Hanging Rock, the novel and all adaptations that include her) jumps out a window.
 Alison Webster (Coronation Street), throws herself in front of a passing truck.
 Krystal Weedon (The Casual Vacancy), intentional overdose of heroin.
 Werther (The Sorrows of Young Werther) and (Werther), gunshot to the head; the fictional suicide touched off a wave of copycat suicides in Europe.
 Mr. White (Spectre), shoots himself in the head.
 C.B. Whiting (Empire Falls), shoots himself in the head.
 Montgomery Wick (Vertical Limit), cuts the rope suspending him, falling to his death.
 Eli Wickner (One False Move), shoots himself.
 Wienis (Foundation), shoots himself with an atomic blaster.
 Campbell Williams (Cold Sassy Tree), shoots himself.
 Sasha Williams (The Walking Dead), ingests cyanide.
 William 'Bill' Willoughby (Three Billboards Outside Ebbing, Missouri), shoots himself.
 George Wilson (The Great Gatsby), shoots himself.
 Donna Windsor (Emmerdale), jumps from the top of a multi-storey car park.
 Dallas "Dally" Winston (The Outsiders), suicide by police after robbing a grocery store.
 Mr. Wishnow (The Plot Against America), hangs himself.
 Frank Wolff (Explorers on the Moon), throws himself into space.
 Sid Worley (An Officer and a Gentleman), hangs himself.
 May Wright (EastEnders), fills a room with gas and lights a cigarette, causing an explosion.

X 
 Professor X (Age of Apocalypse), takes a psi-knife from Legion to save Magneto.
 Xander (Fire Emblem Fates: Birthright), suicide by cop.
 Xiaodouzi (Farewell My Concubine), real name Cheng Dieyi, stabs himself with a sword.

Y 
 Lord Yabu (Shōgun), commits seppuku to atone for a ninja attack and a murder.
 Yoshimi Yahagi (Battle Royale), in the film, hangs herself alongside Yuji Kuramuto.
 Mrs. Yamada (No-No Boy), drowns herself in a tub.
 Kazuhiko Yamamoto (Battle Royale), throws himself off a cliff alongside Sakura Ogawa.
 Gisele Yashar (Fast & Furious 6), while trying to get back onto a car harpooned to the wing of a plane trying to take off, lets go of Han Lue's hand to shoot an oncoming thug and save him, falling to her death in a suicide attack.
 Haruki Yasutani (A Tale for the Time Being), Kamikaze.
 Adam Yates (The Innocent), gunshot.
 Deanna Yeller (Drop Shot), gunshot in the head.
 Yin Susu (The Heaven Sword and Dragon Saber), stabs herself.
 Shinya Yokoyama (Unnatural), falls onto knives in an attempt to frame school bullies of his supposed murder.
 Chisa Yomoda (Serial Experiments Lain), jumps off of a building. 
 Goro Yoshida (The Man with the Red Tattoo), seppuku.
 Saki Yoshida (Metamorphosis), overdoses on heroin.
 Alaska Young (Looking for Alaska), drives straight into a police car while drunk; it is debated whether it was a suicide or not.
 Beth Young (Desperate Housewives), shoots herself to the head.
 Mary Alice Young (Desperate Housewives), gunshot to the head; the suicide enables the character to portray the role of narrator of the series from a dead point of view.
 Phil Young (The Bill), feeds exhaust fumes into his car.
 Yuan Yang (Dream of the Red Chamber), hangs herself to fight against arranged marriage.
 Princess Yue (Avatar: The Last Airbender), sacrifices her life to revive Tui the Moon Spirit.
 Yuma (Saga), self-immolation.
 Yuri (Doki Doki Literature Club!), stabs herself.

Z 
 Z-one (Yu-Gi-Oh! 5Ds), sacrifices himself to stop the Divine Temple from destroying New Domino City by ramming himself into the Divine Temple's reactor.
 Louis Zabel (Wall Street: Money Never Sleeps) jumps in front of a subway train.
 Zane (Lego Ninjago: Masters of Spinjitzu), sacrifices himself to stop and defeat The Overlord.
 Sophie Zawistowska (Sophie's Choice), ingests sodium cyanide along with her lover.
 Gordon Zellanby (The Midwich Cuckoos), suicide bombing.
 Zerkow (Greed), jumps into the San Francisco Bay.
 Zhu Yingtai (Butterfly Lovers), jumps into Liang Shanbo's tomb. 
 Zia (Wristcutters: A Love Story), slits his wrists.
 Bertrand Zobrist (Inferno), jumps to his death from Badia Fiorentina.
 Zog (Teenage Mutant Ninja Turtles), sacrifices himself by jumping into a blazing fire with Shredder.
 Tali'Zorah vas Normandy (Mass Effect 3), jumps off a cliff.

See also
List of suicide crisis lines
List of suicides

References

 
 
Suicides
Suicide-related lists
Articles containing video clips